The 2021 AFC Cup was the 17th edition of the AFC Cup, Asia's secondary club football tournament organized by the Asian Football Confederation (AFC).

The winners of the tournament automatically qualified for the 2022 AFC Champions League, entering the qualifying play-offs, if they had not qualified through their domestic performance.

Lebanese club Al-Ahed, having won their first AFC Cup title in 2019, were the title holders, since the 2020 edition was cancelled due to the COVID-19 pandemic in Asia after several group stage matches and the title was not awarded. However, they were eliminated by eventual winners Al-Muharraq in the West Asia Zonal semi-finals.

Association team allocation
The 46 AFC member associations (excluding the Northern Mariana Islands, which became a full member in December 2020 and are not eligible for this season) are ranked based on their clubs' performance over the last four years in AFC competitions (their national team's FIFA World Rankings no longer considered). The slots are allocated by the following criteria according to the Entry Manual:
The associations are split into five zones (Article 5.1):
West Asia Zone consists of the 12 associations from the West Asian Football Federation (WAFF).
South Asia Zone consists of the 7 associations from the South Asian Football Federation (SAFF).
Central Asia Zone consists of the 6 associations from Central Asian Football Association (CAFA).
ASEAN Zone consists of the 12 associations from the ASEAN Football Federation (AFF).
East Asia Zone consists of the 9 associations from the East Asian Football Federation (EAFF).
The AFC may reallocate one or more associations to another zone if necessary for sporting reasons.
Excluding the top five associations in each region for AFC Champions League slot allocation, all other associations are eligible to enter the AFC Cup.
The teams from associations ranked 6th, 11th and 12th which are eliminated in the AFC Champions League qualifying play-offs enter the AFC Cup group stage (Article 3.2). The following rules are applied:
The associations ranked 6th in both the West Region and the East Region, while allocated one direct slot in the AFC Cup group stage without taking away any direct slot from other associations, are not ranked in each zone for AFC Cup slot allocation (Article 5.3).
If they advance to the AFC Champions League group stage, the AFC Cup group stage slot is filled by the standby team from their association if such team are available (Article 5.12).
The rules above do not apply to the AFC Champions League title holders and AFC Cup title holders which are allocated AFC Champions League play-off slots should they not qualify for the tournament through domestic performance.
In the West Asia Zone and the ASEAN Zone, there are three groups in the group stage, including 9 direct slots, with the 3 remaining slots filled through qualifying play-offs (Article 5.2). The slots in each zone are distributed as follows:
The associations ranked 1st to 3rd are each allocated two direct slots.
The associations ranked 4th to 6th are each allocated one direct slot and one play-off slot.
The associations ranked 7th or below are each allocated get one play-off slot.
If any zone has an association ranked 6th for AFC Champions League slot allocation, which is allocated one direct slot in the AFC Cup group stage, there are 10 direct slots, with the 2 remaining slots filled through qualifying play-offs.
In the South Asia Zone, the Central Asia Zone, and the East Asia Zone, there is one group in the group stage, including 3 direct slots, with the 1 remaining slot filled through qualifying play-offs (Article 5.2). The slots in each zone are distributed as follows:
The associations ranked 1st to 3rd are each allocated one direct slot and one play-off slot.
The associations ranked 4th or below are each allocated one play-off slot.
If any zone has an association ranked 6th for AFC Champions League slot allocation, which is allocated one direct slot in the AFC Cup group stage, there are 4 direct slots, and to ensure equal opportunity in each zone, another group is added to this zone in the group stage, with the 4 remaining slots filled through qualifying play-offs (Article 5.4.1).
If any zone has at least 7 play-off slots, to ensure equal opportunity in each zone, another group is added to this zone in the group stage, with the 5 remaining slots filled through qualifying play-offs (Article 5.4.2).
If any association with direct slots do not fulfill any one of the AFC Cup criteria, they have all their direct slots converted into play-off slots. The direct slots given up are redistributed to the highest eligible association by the following criteria (Articles 5.7 and 5.8):
For each association, the maximum number of total slots is two (Articles 3.4 and 3.5).
If any association is allocated one additional direct slot, one play-off slot is annulled and not redistributed.
If any association with only play-off slot(s), including those mentioned above, do not fulfill the minimum AFC Cup criteria, the play-off slot(s) are annulled and not redistributed (Articles 5.10 and 5.11).
For each association, the maximum number of total slots is one-third of the total number of eligible teams (excluding foreign teams) in the top division (Article 5.6). If this rule is applied, any direct slots given up are redistributed by the same criteria as mentioned above, and play-off slots are annulled and not redistributed (Article 9.10).
All participating teams must be granted an AFC Champions League or AFC Cup license, and apart from cup winners, finish in the top half of their top division (Articles 7.1 and 9.5). If any association do not have enough teams which satisfy this criteria, any direct slots given up are redistributed by the same criteria as mentioned above, and play-off slots are annulled and not redistributed (Article 9.9).
If any team granted a license refuses to participate, their slot, either direct or play-off, is annulled and not redistributed (Article 9.11).

Association ranking
For the 2021 AFC Cup, the associations are allocated slots according to their association ranking which was published on 29 November 2019, which takes into account their performance in the AFC Champions League and the AFC Cup during the period between 2016 and 2019.

Notes

Teams
Teams in italics will play in the AFC Champions League qualifying play-offs, and will play in the AFC Cup group stage if they fail to advance to the AFC Champions League group stage. Should they advance to the AFC Champions League group stage, they will not play in the AFC Cup, and will be replaced by the standby team from their association if such team are available.

Notes

Schedule
The schedule of the competition is as follows.

On 11 November 2020, the AFC approved a new calendar for the competition due to the COVID-19 pandemic, where the group stage is played as centralized single round-robin tournament, and the preliminary round, play-off round, and ASEAN Zonal semi-finals and final are played as a single match. On 25 January 2021, the AFC published the schedule of the competition. On 1 March 2021, the AFC announced the hosts for the group stage, except for Group G whose hosts will be decided at a later date. On 27 March 2021, the AFC announced that the West Asia Zone group matches were rescheduled from 23 to 29 May to 21–27 May. On 26 April 2021, the AFC announced that the ASEAN Zone group matches were rescheduled from 22 to 28 June to 29 June – 6 July. On 3 May 2021, the AFC announced that the East Asia Zone group matches were rescheduled from 14 to 20 May to 23–29 June. On 9 May 2021, the AFC announced that the South Asia Zone group matches which were originally scheduled between 14 and 20 May would be postponed indefinitely. On 27 May 2021, the AFC announced that the ASEAN Zone group matches which were originally scheduled between 29 June – 6 July would be postponed indefinitely. On 7 July 2021, AFC decided to cancel the matches in ASEAN Zone.

Notes:
W: West Asia Zone
S: South Asia Zone
C: Central Asia Zone
A: ASEAN Zone
E: East Asia Zone

The original schedule of the competition, as planned before the pandemic, was as follows.

Qualifying play-offs

Preliminary round 1

Preliminary round 2

Play-off round

Group stage

Group A

Group B

Group C

Group D

Group E

Group F

Group G (cancelled)

Group H (cancelled)

Group I (cancelled)

Group J

Ranking of runner-up teams

West Asia Zone

ASEAN Zone (cancelled)

Knockout stage

Bracket

Zonal semi-finals

Zonal finals

Inter-zone play-off semi-finals

Inter-zone play-off final

Final

Top scorers

See also
2021 AFC Champions League
2021 AFC Women's Club Championship

Notes

References

External links

2
 
2021
Association football events postponed due to the COVID-19 pandemic
Association football events curtailed due to the COVID-19 pandemic